LWH may refer to:

 Lawrence Hill railway station has National Rail code LWH
 Lightweight Helmet
 Liverpool Women's Hospital
 White Lachi is a Tai–Kadai language with ISO 639:l language code lwh